Fred is an unincorporated community in southeastern Tyler County, Texas, United States.

Fred is approximately 40 miles north of Beaumont and is located in the Big Thicket.

References

Unincorporated communities in Tyler County, Texas
Unincorporated communities in Texas